The Methodist Episcopal Church of Winooski, also known as the Winooski United Methodist Church, is an historic Methodist church building located at 24 West  Allen Street in Winooski, Vermont. It was built in 1918, and is a significant local example of vernacular Carpenter Gothic architecture.  On March 2, 2001, it was added to the National Register of Historic Places.

Architecture and history
The Winooski United Methodist Church stands in downtown Winooski, at the southwest corner of West Allen and Follett Streets.  It is a large single-story wood-frame structure, with a gabled roof.  Its exterior is clad in a combination of wooden clapboards and shingles, some the latter cut in decorative patterns.  A square tower rises through the left side of the roof, with tripart louvered openings in the belfry stage and a truncated hip roof at the top.  The main facade is roughly symmetrical, with recessed lancet-arched porches at the corners and a large lancet stained-glass window at the center.  The left porch houses the main entrance, which is a double door topped by a lancet stained-glass window, while the right porch houses a smaller secondary entrance.

Winooski's Methodist congregation was formally organized in 1847, having been affiliated with the church's Burlington chapter since early Methodist preaching began in the area in the 1830s. The congregation had by 1860 raised sufficient funds for a church, which was built on the present site.  That church burned down in 1917, and the present church was built the following year.

See also
National Register of Historic Places listings in Chittenden County, Vermont

References

External links

Winooski UMC web site

Churches on the National Register of Historic Places in Vermont
Carpenter Gothic church buildings in Vermont
Churches completed in 1918
20th-century Methodist church buildings in the United States
Methodist churches in Vermont
Buildings and structures in Winooski, Vermont
Churches in Chittenden County, Vermont
National Register of Historic Places in Chittenden County, Vermont
Methodist Episcopal churches in the United States